Ulsan Broadcasting Corporation (UBC) is a regional television and radio broadcasting company based in Ulsan. The station is an affiliate of the SBS Network.

Stations

 Television
Channel - Ch. 30 (LCN 6-1)
Launched - September 1, 1997
Affiliated with - SBS
Call Sign - HLDP-DTV
 FM radio (ubc Green FM)
Frequency - FM 92.3 MHz
Launched - September 1, 2001
Affiliated with - SBS Power FM
Call Sign - HLDP-FM

See also
SBS (Korea)

External links
 

Seoul Broadcasting System affiliates
Radio stations established in 2001
Television channels and stations established in 1997
Mass media in Ulsan
Companies based in Ulsan